Raoul Henkart (11 June 1907 – 13 February 1955) was a Belgian fencer. He competed at the 1932 and 1948 Summer Olympics.

References

1907 births
1955 deaths
Belgian male fencers
Belgian épée fencers
Olympic fencers of Belgium
Fencers at the 1932 Summer Olympics
Fencers at the 1948 Summer Olympics
Sportspeople from Brussels